Ciénaga Grande can refer to:

Cerro Ciénaga Grande, mountain peak in Salta Province, Argentina
Ciénaga Grande de Santa Marta, swamp in Colombia
Cienaga Grande del Bajo Sinú, swamp in Colombia